The Dong-Feng 21 (DF-21; NATO reporting name CSS-5 - Dong-Feng is a two-stage, solid-fuel rocket, single-warhead medium-range ballistic missile (MRBM) in the Dong Feng series developed by China Changfeng Mechanics and Electronics Technology Academy. Development started in the late 1960s and was completed around 1985–86, but it was not deployed until 1991. It was developed from the submarine-launched JL-1 missile, and is China's first solid-fuel land-based missile. The U.S. Department of Defense in 2008 estimated that China had 60-80 missiles and 60 launchers; approximately 10-11 missiles can be built annually.

Originally developed as a strategic weapon, the DF-21's later variants were designed for both nuclear and conventional missions. It is thought able to carry a high explosive, submunition, or 300 kt nuclear warhead. The latest DF-21D was said to be the world's first anti-ship ballistic missile (ASBM). The DF-21 has also been developed into a space-capable anti-satellite weapon/anti-missile weapon carrier.

Though the launcher itself is mobile to reduce vulnerability, an actual launch unit requires support vehicles that can cover a 300×300-meter area, making it hard to move quickly and easier to detect.  Also, the wheeled launcher is not made to travel off-road and requires solid ground when firing to prevent backblast and debris damage due to the hard launch, restricting its firing locations to roads and pre-made launch pads.

DF-21/A/C (CSS-5 Mod-1/2/3) 
The basic variant DF-21 had a range of 1,770+ km, and a payload of  consisting of a single 500 kt nuclear warhead, with an estimated circular error probable (CEP) of 300~400 m; this version did not enter operational service. The DF-21A was operational by 1996 and has improved accuracy with an estimated CEP of 100~300 m.

The missile was the first dual-capable version, able to be armed with either a nuclear or conventional warhead. In 2010, the DF-21C was being deployed in central Western China.

DF-21D (CSS-5 Mod-4) Anti-ship ballistic missile

Development
This is an anti-ship ballistic missile that has a maximum range exceeding , according to the U.S. National Air and Space Intelligence Center. The Intelligence Center did not believe it was deployed in 2009. The guidance system is thought to be still in an evolutionary process as more UAVs and satellites are added. It has been noted to have difficulties with internal power systems and loses accuracy over flight time.

The US Department of Defense stated in 2010 that China has developed and reached initial operating capability (IOC) of a conventionally armed high hypersonic land-based anti-ship ballistic missile based on the DF-21. This is the first ASBM and weapon system capable of targeting a moving aircraft carrier strike group from long-range, land-based mobile launchers. The DF-21D is thought to employ maneuverable reentry vehicles (MaRVs) with a terminal guidance system. Such a missile may have been tested in 2005-6, and the launch of the Jianbing-5/YaoGan-1 and Jianbing-6/YaoGan-2 satellites would give the Chinese targeting information from SAR (synthetic-aperture radar) and visual imaging respectively. The upgrades enhance China's ability to prevent US carriers from operating in the Taiwan Strait. Some have also suggested China could develop a DF-21D with multiple reentry vehicles.

Guidance and navigation
China has recently launched a series of satellites to support its ASBM efforts:
 Yaogan-VII electro-optical satellite - 9 December 2009
 Yaogan-VIII synthetic aperture radar satellite - 14 December 2009
 Yaogan-IX Naval Ocean Surveillance System (NOSS) constellation (3 satellites in formation) - 5 March 2010.
 Yaogan-XVI Naval Ocean Surveillance System (NOSS) constellation  - 25 November 2012

China is reported to be working on an over-the-horizon radar to locate the targets for the ASBM. An apparent test of the missile was made against a target in the Gobi desert in January 2013.

Re-entry vehicle
The DF-21D re-entry vehicle appears to bear similarities to the American Pershing II missile's RV, which was withdrawn from service in 1988. Army training manuals about the missile are available on the internet and public open-source literature extensively describes it; the DF-21 has a comparable range and payload. Though much is made of the DF-21D's damage infliction ability based solely on velocity and kinetic energy, the Australian Strategic Policy Institute has calculated that the energy of an inert  RV impacting at Mach 6 had similar energy to the combined kinetic and explosive power of the American subsonic Harpoon anti-ship missile, which is one-quarter the energy of the Russian supersonic  Kh-22 missile traveling at Mach 4 with a  warhead.

Impact on naval warfare
In 2009, the United States Naval Institute stated that there was "currently ... no defense against [a warhead able to destroy an aircraft carrier in one hit]" if it worked as theorized. It was reported in 2010 that China was finalizing development of a MaRV warhead for the DF-21. The United States Navy has responded by switching its focus from a close blockade force of shallow water vessels to return to building deep water ballistic missile defense (BMD) destroyers. The United States has also assigned most of its ballistic missile defense capable ships to the Pacific, extended the BMD program to all Aegis destroyers and increased procurement of SM-3 BMD missiles. The United States also has a large network optimized for tracking ballistic missile launches which may give carrier groups sufficient warning in order to move away from the target area while the missile is in flight. Kinetic defenses against the DF-21D would be difficult. The Navy's primary ballistic missile interceptor, the SM-3, would not be effective since it is designed to intercept missiles in the mid-course phase in space, so it would have to be launched almost immediately to hit before reentry or from an Aegis ship positioned under its flight path. The SM-2 Block 4 can intercept missiles reentering the atmosphere, but the warhead will be performing high-G maneuvers that may complicate interception. By 2016, the US Navy was testing the vastly more capable SM-6, which is designed to intercept ballistic missiles in the terminal phase. The SM-6 began deployment in 2011.

In late 2013, a Russian Military Analysis report of the DF-21D concluded that the only way to successfully counter it would be through electronic countermeasures. Conventional interceptions of high-speed objectives have worked in the past, with the Russian report citing the 2008 interception of a malfunctioning satellite by a U.S. cruiser, but in that situation the warship had extensive knowledge of its location and trajectory. Against an attack from the Mach 10 DF-21D without knowing the missile's launch point, the U.S. Navy's only way to evade it would be through electronic countermeasures.

Use of such a missile has been said by some experts to potentially lead to nuclear exchange, regional arms races with India and Japan, and the end of the INF Treaty between the United States and the Soviet Union, to which the People's Republic of China is not a party.

Skepticism
The emergence of the DF-21D has some analysts claiming that the "carrier killer" missiles have rendered the American use of aircraft carriers obsolete, as they are too vulnerable in the face of the new weapon and not worth the expense. Military leaders in the U.S. Navy and Air Force, however, do not see it as a "game changer" to completely count carriers out.

First, the missile may not be able to single-handedly destroy its target, as the warhead is believed to only be enough to inflict a "mission kill" that makes a carrier unable to conduct flight operations.

Secondly, there is the problem of finding its target. Over-the-horizon radars cannot pinpoint a carrier's exact location, and would have to be used in conjunction with Chinese recon satellites. Though recon aircraft and submarines could also be used to look for the carrier, they are vulnerable to the carrier battle group's defenses.

The missile's "kill chain" requires processing and constantly updating a carrier's location details, preparing the launch, programming information and firing. The U.S. military's AirSea Battle concept involves disrupting such kill chains. Some U.S. analysts believe that the DF-21D does not fly any faster than Mach 5.

The DF-21D may also not be as fast as theorized. It cannot acquire its target until this point due to ionization blockage, leaving a relatively short time to actually search for a ship. This could enable the target to leave the area if the missile is detected soon enough before it engages its terminal sensors, and the slower speed upon reentry leaves it vulnerable to missile interceptors.

Appearances and deployments
The missile was shown to the public during the parade in Beijing celebrating 70 years since the end of World War II on September 3, 2015. A parade video shows missiles marked as DF-21D.

On 26 August 2020, along with a DF-26B, a DF-21D was launched into an area of the South China Sea between Hainan and the Paracel Islands, one day after China said that an American U-2 spy plane entered a no-fly zone without its permission during a Chinese live-fire naval drill in Bohai Sea off its north coast and came as Washington blacklisted 24 Chinese companies and targeted individuals it said were part of construction and military activities in the South China Sea. US officials subsequently assessed that the People's Liberation Army Rocket Force (PLARF) had fired four medium-range ballistic missiles in total. The missile tests drew criticism from Japan, the Pentagon and Taiwan.

DF-26 

Its existence was officially confirmed by the Chinese state in the mid-2010s, but it had already been in service for several years.

On 26 August 2020, a DF-26B was fired from Qinghai province into an area between Hainan and the Paracel Islands as a response to a U.S. U-2 spy plane entering into a no-fly zone during a Chinese live-fire naval drill the day earlier.

CH-AS-X-13 

Air-launched ballistic missile version of DF-21. carried by H-6K. The 3000 km range missile is scheduled for deployment in 2025.

Saudi Arabian purchase

In January 2014, Newsweek revealed that Saudi Arabia had secretly bought a number of DF-21 medium-range ballistic missiles in 2007. They also said that the American CIA had allowed the deal to go through as long as the missiles were modified to not be able to carry nuclear warheads. Saudi Arabia had previously secretly acquired Chinese DF-3A ballistic missiles in 1988, which was publicly revealed. While the DF-3 has a longer range, it was designed to carry a nuclear payload, and so had poor accuracy (0.6-2.4 miles (1000–4000 m) CEP) if used with a conventional warhead. It would only be useful against large area targets like cities and military bases. This made them useless during the Gulf War for retaliating against Iraqi Scud missile attacks, as they would cause mass civilian casualties and would not be as effective as the ongoing coalition air attacks. After the war, the Saudis and the CIA worked together to covertly allow the purchase of Chinese DF-21s. The DF-21 is solid-fueled instead of liquid-fueled like the DF-3, so it takes less time to prepare for launch. It is accurate to 30 meters CEP, allowing it to attack specific targets like compounds or palaces. The Saudis are not known to possess mobile launchers, but may use the same 12 launchers originally bought with the DF-3s. The number of DF-21 missiles that were bought is unknown. Newsweek speculates that details of the deal being made public is part of Saudi deterrence against Iran. In Sep 2014, Saudi Arabia purchased CSS-5s ballistic missiles from China to defend Mecca and Medina, said Dr. Anwar Eshki, a retired major general in the Saudi armed forces. Saudi significantly escalated its ballistic missile program with help from China according to US intel.

See also 
Dong Neng-3

References

External links 
 CSIS Missile Threat - Dong Feng-21 
 Global Security description
 Sinodefense description
 Encyclopedia Astronautica description
 The Chinese DF-21D anti carrier weapon kill chain - Youtube.com

Ballistic missiles of the People's Republic of China
Weapons of the People's Republic of China
Nuclear missiles of the People's Republic of China
Anti-satellite missiles
Synthetic aperture radar
Medium-range ballistic missiles
Military equipment introduced in the 1990s